Reginald Lecarno Pleasant (born May 2, 1962 in Pinewood, South Carolina) is a former professional gridiron football defensive back. Playing collegiately for Clemson University, where he won a National Championship in 1981. He then played in the Canadian Football League for eleven seasons with the Toronto Argonauts and the Edmonton Eskimos. He won a Grey Cup with the Argonauts in 1991. He started his professional career with the Atlanta Falcons of the National Football League in 1985. He still holds the Toronto Argonauts record for the most career interceptions and most interception return yards.

References

1962 births
Living people
American football defensive backs
Clemson Tigers football players
American players of Canadian football
Canadian football defensive backs
Atlanta Falcons players
Toronto Argonauts players
Edmonton Elks players
People from Pinewood, South Carolina